Johannes Marinus Antonius (Jan) Teulings (29 May 1905 – 22 September 1989) was a Dutch actor. He appeared in more than thirty films from 1936 to 1987.

Filmography

References

External links 

1905 births
1989 deaths
Dutch film directors
Dutch male film actors
Dutch male television actors
People from Hilversum